Cadet Creek is a stream in northwestern Osage County in the U.S. state of Missouri. It is a tributary of the Osage River.

The confluence is about 1.5 miles south of Osage City.

Cadet Creek has the name of the local Cadet family.

See also
List of rivers of Missouri

References

Rivers of Osage County, Missouri
Rivers of Missouri